Gene Bissell Field, in Salina, Kansas, is the home field for the Kansas Wesleyan University Coyotes football and soccer teams. 
The field at the former Glenn L. Martin Stadium at KWU was officially named Bissell Field on October 8, 1994, in a ceremony preceding the Homecoming football game that day against Friends University, in Franklin Gene Bissell's honor. The day was also proclaimed as "Gene Bissell Day" by then Salina mayor Joe Warner. The field was rededicated in his honor on October 2, 2015, prior to the inaugural game at the Graves Family Sports Complex on the KWU campus signifying the long-lasting impact that Bissell had on students, athletes, faculty and the community.

The field is circled with a collegiate track and includes a grandstand which seats over 1900 spectators. The field is part of the Graves Family Sports Complex, which replaced the demolished Glen Martin Stadium.

References

College football venues
College soccer venues in the United States
Kansas Wesleyan Coyotes football
American football venues in Kansas
Soccer venues in Kansas
Sports venues in Salina, Kansas
1994 establishments in Kansas
Sports venues completed in 2015